This is a list of Japanese football J2 League transfers in the winter transfer window 2016–17 by club.

Nagoya Grampus

In:

>

Out:

Shonan Bellmare

In:

Out:

Avispa Fukuoka

In:

Out:

Matsumoto Yamaga

In:

Out:

Kyoto Sanga FC

In:

Out:

Fagiano Okayama

In:

Out:

Machida Zelvia

In:

Out:

Yokohama FC

In:

Out:

Tokushima Vortis

In:

Out:

Ehime FC

In:

Out:

JEF United Chiba

In:

Out:

Renofa Yamaguchi

In:

Out:

Mito HollyHock

In:

Out:

Montedio Yamagata

In:

Out:

V-Varen Nagasaki

In:

Out:

Roasso Kumamoto

In:

Out:

Thespakusatsu Gunma

In:

Out:

Tokyo Verdy

In:

Out:

Kamatamare Sanuki

In:

Out:

FC Gifu

In:

Out:

Zweigen Kanazawa

In:

Out:

Oita Trinita

In:

Out:

References 

2016–17
Transfers
Japan